Planet Television was a local television station based in Tirana, Albania and was affiliated to Kristal University.

The station was reported as having gone bankrupt in 2012 due to a major diploma mill scandal at the university.

References

Defunct television networks in Albania
Mass media in Tirana
Television channels and stations disestablished in 2012